The 1971 Gator Bowl (January) was a college football postseason bowl game between the unranked Ole Miss Rebels and the 10th-ranked Auburn Tigers, both of the Southeastern Conference. It was played in Jacksonville, Florida, on January 2, 1971, the day after the major bowl games.

Background
This was a matchup of two SEC teams, fourth-place Ole Miss and second-place Auburn, that rarely played each other. Although in the same conference, they had met only once since 1953, in the Liberty Bowl in December 1965.

The Rebels made their fourteenth straight bowl appearance in Johnny Vaught's final full season as head coach, but it was their first Gator Bowl since 1958. This was Archie Manning's final game as Rebel quarterback. This was Auburn's third straight bowl game and first Gator Bowl since 1955. Auburn quarterback Pat Sullivan won the Heisman Trophy the following season.

Neither head coach was on the sidelines due to medical reasons:  from a mild heart attack and Auburn's Ralph Jordan was recovering from an appendectomy.

Scoring
First quarter
Auburn – Terry Beasley 8 pass from Pat Sullivan (Gardner Jett kick)
Auburn – Alvin Bresler 7 pass from Sullivan (Jett kick)

Second quarter
Auburn – Sullivan 37 run (Jett kick)
Ole Miss – Archie Manning 2 run (Poole kick)
Ole Miss – Floyd Franks 34 pass from Manning (Poole kick)

Third quarter
Auburn – Mickey Zofko 6 run (Jett kick)
Ole Miss – Jim Poole 23 pass from Shug Chumbler (Poole kick)
Auburn – Larry Willingham 55 punt return (Jett kick)

Fourth quarter
Ole Miss – Chumbler 1 run (Poole kick)

Auburn jumped out to a  lead and Ole Miss pulled to within seven at halftime, but could get no closer as the teams traded touchdowns in the second half. Manning went 19-of-28 for 180 yards while rushing for 95 yards on 11 carries, with two touchdowns and one interception. Sullivan went 27-of-43 for 351 yards and rushed for 35 yards on 10 carries, with three touchdowns and one interception.

Aftermath
Vaught was replaced by Billy Kinard before the next season started. Kinard reached one bowl in his tenure before being fired midway through the 1973 season, and Vaught replaced Kinard for the final eight games, going  Ralph Jordan led Auburn for five additional seasons and the Tigers reached four more bowl games.

Statistics
{| class=wikitable style="text-align:center"

! Statistics !!   Ole Miss   !!   Auburn  
|-
|align=left|First downs ||21 ||23
|-
|align=left|Rushing yards ||209 ||208
|-
|align=left|Passing yards ||256 ||351
|-
|align=left|Total yards ||465 ||559
|-
|align=left|Passes  ||23–39–1|| 27–44–1
|-
|align=left|Punts–average ||6–47.3 ||4–40.5
|-
|align=left|Fumbles lost ||4 ||2
|-
|align=left|Penalties–yards ||2–13 ||6–63
|}

See also
 Auburn–Ole Miss football rivalry

References

Gator Bowl
Gator Bowl
Ole Miss Rebels football bowl games
Auburn Tigers football bowl games
Gator Bowl (January)
Gator Bowl (January)